Atlético Independiente is a Honduran soccer club based on Siguatepeque, Honduras. The club currently plays in Liga de Ascenso de Honduras.

History

Club Atlético Independiente was founded on October 12, 1960, by Luis Méndez and Julio Zepeda. The club originally played in Liga de Fútbol “Amado Sánchez”, an independent league in Siguatepeque, until 1979, when the club was promoted to Segunda Division (now called Liga de Ascenso).

Since 1979, Atlético Independiente has been one of the most known and respected clubs in Liga de Ascenso. The club has come close to being promoted to Liga Nacional de Honduras in many occasions, the closest being in 1990, where it lost a playoff game for the final to Tela Timsa.  Until 2017, they were the only team to play in every Liga de Ascenso season.  They were relegated to Honduran Liga Mayor in June 2017 as they didn't show up at the last game for the No relegation match against Estrella Roja, thus losing the category automatically.

Achievements
Segunda División / Liga de Ascenso
Runners-up (1): 1984, 1995–96, 2009–10 C, 2014–15 C

External links
History of Atlético Independiente

References

Football clubs in Honduras
1960 establishments in Honduras
Association football clubs established in 1960